The Anti-Christian Movement (非基督教运动) was an intellectual and political movement in China in the 1920s. The May Fourth Movement for a New Culture attacked religion of all sorts, including Confucianism and Buddhism as well as Christianity, rejecting all as superstition. The various movements were also inspired by modernizing attitudes deriving from both nationalist and socialist ideologies, as well as feeding on older anti-Christian sentiment that was in large part due to repeated invasions of China by Western countries. The Chinese Nationalists had also sought unity in their country as well as a transformation in the way that their society operated which seemed to heavily rely upon Western thought and/or ideals. They brought forth age-old criticisms about the Western religion and accused the Christian missionaries of actively participating in it as a way of eliminating the native culture like other foreign imperialists.

Origins 
The most influential publication behind the movement was an article by Zhu Zhixin, a colleague of Sun Yat-sen, entitled What Is Jesus?, first published in 1919 and much republished thereafter. Zhu argued that Jesus was an ordinary illegitimate peasant child who became the leader of a band of mystical enthusiasts (with bandit elements) such as were often found in Chinese history. One precipitating factor was the publication in 1922 of The Christian Occupation of China, a large-scale study of China's Protestant Christian churches and China's resources. Although the publication had been intended to prepare the way for turning Chinese churches over to Chinese Christians, the title seemed to show a different intent. A student movement was founded, garnering support at a number of universities, initially to oppose the planned meeting of the conference of the World Student Christian Federation in China, and more generally to counter-act the baleful influence of Christianity on China's attempts to modernize.

Course 
Pamphlets, rallies and petitions were numerous from 1922 through 1927.

The killing of six Christian missionaries during the Nanking Incident of 1927 has been attributed to the influence of the movement, but can also be attributed to more generalized xenophobia. 

In response to the attacks on Christian missionaries from various Chinese rebellions, the Churches sent out more missionaries to China in a “Faith Movement” to invigorate a call to faith for the Chinese.  Despite the rejection and danger, many missionaries were also convinced that by the twentieth century, the “Second Coming of Christ” would occur and thus, they seemed desperate to save as many people as they could before it was too late.

Those that participated in persecuting the American Christians used fear tactics such as destroying the homes of the missionaries or kidnapping them and leaving them stranded somewhere in the wilderness, and caused multiple emotional breakdowns for many.

American Christians began to become furloughed from all the chaos and panic as well as some of the Church's loss of funds. Chinese Christians were left in charge of the institutions that were left behind but many were persecuted still because of the contradicting ideals of the natives and Christianity.

The movement effectively came to an end with Chiang Kai-shek's baptism in 1929 and the appointment of T. V. Soong, a Christian, as premier in 1930.

The anti-Christian Movement indeed drove many foreign missionaries out of China but it ironically strengthened Chinese Christians' movement for the indigenization of churches in their country.

See also 
 Criticism of Christianity

References 

1920s in China
History of Christianity in China
Anti-Christian sentiment in Asia